XDP may refer to:

 eXpress Data Path, high-performance data path merged into the Linux kernel
 XML Data Package, XML file format created by Adobe Systems in 2003
 X-linked dystonia parkinsonism, rare x-linked progressive movement disorder